Foitite is a mineral in the tourmaline group, it is a vacancy-dominant member of the group. Foitite is in the 'vacancy' group, due to the absence of atoms in the X site.

According to the Czech Geological Society, foitite is rare. However foitite is quite common among low-temperature tourmalines and it might be more common than previously thought.

The color of the mineral is dark indigo with purple tints to bluish-black.

Name 
The mineral was named in 1993 by D. J. MacDonald, Frank C. Hawthorne, and Joel D.Grice after Franklin F. Foit, Jr.

Chemistry 

It lacks alkalis like sodium.

Occurrence 
It occurs in quartz veins and possibly occurs in granite pegmatites.

Foitite has also been reported in Marquette County, Michigan. Its type locality is California.

It has been reported in Wales and it is predicted that a more widespread distribution of the mineral in Wales will be shown.

References 

Tourmalines